Sri Chakram is a 2016 Kannada film, directed by Govinde Gowda for SLN Productions, produced by B Ramprasad.

Arav Surya and model Teena Ponnappa are part of the cast, along with Shobraj, Jai Jagadish, Gururaj Hoskote, Bank Janardhan,Editing and DOP done by Vikram Yoganand and Music by Prabhu SR. This movie is said to be an action entertainer with commercial elements, as shown in the trailer.  In 2015 the team launched their audio event at Ballari. Sri Chakram released on 1 April 2016 following post-production.

Plot
A couple who are madly in love decides to go on a road trip. However, their plans are foiled when a notorious gangster decides to follow them on their journey and kill them

Cast

 Arav Surya
 Teena Ponnappa
 Jai Jagadish
 Bank Janardhan
 Shobraj
 Jai Ram
 Gururaj Hoskote

Production 
Director Govinde Gowda revealed that he would direct his feature film, which would be for SLN Productions, produced by B Ramprasad in 2016.

Casting
Arav Surya and model Teena Ponnappa are part of the cast

Cinematography
The movie made by debutant has raised expectations among Kannada audience because of its cinematography by D.O.P Vikram Yoganand.

Vikram Yoganand, who added, "The whole process of making the film was very gratifying and exciting. It’s something I would do for the rest of my life. We want to be successful in doing meaningful films and put our heart and soul into filmmaking."

Release 
Sri Chakram released on 1 April 2016 following post-production.

References

2016 films
2010s Kannada-language films